Ghaida Nurul Ghaniyu (born 5 September 1998) is an Indonesian badminton player. She trains at the PB Djarum club, and joined the club since 2011. She won the girls' singles title at the  Indonesian National Junior Championships in 2016, and claimed her first international title at the 2019 Peru International.

Achievements

BWF International Challenge/Series (3 titles, 1 runner-up) 
Women's singles

  BWF International Challenge tournament
  BWF International Series tournament
  BWF Future Series tournament

References 

1998 births
Living people
Sportspeople from Bandung
Indonesian female badminton players
20th-century Indonesian women
21st-century Indonesian women